The Diocese of Tambov is an eparchy of the Russian Orthodox Church. It combines parishes and monasteries in the Tambov Oblast. The main church is the Transfiguration Cathedral.

History
The Tambov and Rasskazovskaya Diocese was founded in 1682 by decree of Tsar Feodor III and the Patriarch Joachim.  

Originally, the diocese included the city of Tambov as well as Kozlov and Borisoglebsk. 

In 1699, the diocese was closed and placed under the jurisdiction of the Ryazan diocese from 1720 - Voronezh diocese, and since 1723, the Moscow Synodal Office. Managing such a distant diocese through the Moscow Synod office was difficult, so again the question arose of placing a local bishop in charge. The Tambov and Rasskazovo Diocese was closed because the poor people of Tambov destroyed most of the facility. 

In 1758, by decree of Empress Elizabeth, the diocese was restored. In addition to Tambov and Kozlov, the diocese included Dobry, Kerensky Narovchatov Upper and Lower Lomov and Troitsk. In 1764, the diocese added the city of Penza, Borisoglebsk, In SAR, Moksha. In 1779, the city added: Saransk, Morshansk, Kirsanov, Ranenburg, Serdobsk and Chembar. The final borders of the diocese were established in 1803. Since then, it has not come out of the administrative boundaries of the Tambov province, approved in 1796. 

At the end of 1930, no active parish operated in Tambov. Restoring the diocese began in October 1943, when the first church was re-opened. 

https://orthodox-world.org/en/i/27285/Russian-Federation/Tambov/Tambov/Church/New-Martyrs-of-Russia-Orthodox-Church
Eparchies of the Russian Orthodox Church